Radio Skadar is an alternative music radio station in Montenegro. Its headquarters are in the village Beri, on the outskirts of Podgorica. It is named after Lake Skadar near the city of Podgorica. Its frequency is 107.9 MHz, and is available locally in the area around Podgorica.

References

Radio stations in Montenegro
Mass media in Podgorica